The Charleston Golden Eagles, known previously as the Morris Harvey Golden Eagles, are the athletic teams that represent the University of Charleston, located in Charleston, West Virginia, in NCAA Division II intercollegiate sports. The Golden Eagles compete as members of the Mountain East Conference for all varsity sports except men's volleyball. Charleston was a founding member of the Mountain East following the 2013 demise of the West Virginia Intercollegiate Athletic Conference, of which Charleston had been a member since 1924. Prior to 1978, the university was called Morris Harvey College. Charleston's main rivals are the West Virginia State University Yellow Jackets.

Varsity teams

History
In June 2012, UC was one of nine members of the West Virginia Intercollegiate Athletic Conference (WVIAC) that announced their plans to leave to form a new Division II conference. Two months later, the new conference was unveiled as the MEC, with UC as one of 12 charter members. The school's newest sport is men's volleyball, which played its first season as a varsity program in spring 2015. Since men's volleyball has a combined national championship for Division I and Division II schools, UC competes as an effective Division I member in that sport; it spent its first season as an independent before joining the Eastern Intercollegiate Volleyball Association for the 2016 season and beyond.

In 2005, UC entered into a partnership with the local school board to refurbish the school board–owned Laidley Field, which was renamed University of Charleston Stadium. The campus also boasts new or renovated softball, football, baseball, and soccer fields, and competes in 18 Division II sports.

List of teams

Men's sports
 Baseball
 Basketball
 Cross Country
 Football
 Golf
 Soccer
 Tennis
 Track & Field
 Volleyball *

Women's sports
 Basketball
 Cheerleading
 Cross Country
 Golf
 Lacrosse
 Soccer
 Softball
 Tennis
 Track & Field
 Volleyball

 * = Men's volleyball competes in the Eastern Intercollegiate Volleyball Association.

National championships

Team

References

External links